Mushfigabad is a village and municipality in the Garadagh raion of Baku, Azerbaijan. It has a population of 8,011.

References

Populated places in Baku